Clinton High School is a suburban public high school located in Clinton, Mississippi, United States, serving grades 10–12. The incumbent superintendent is Dr. Andy Schoggin, and the principal is Brett Robinson. Assistant principals include Mrs. Areda Cockrell-Harris, Mr. Matt Fulton, and Mr. Drew Wardlaw. The athletic director is Mr. Brian Fortenberry.

Demographics
Clinton High School enrolls approximately 1,139 students per year in grades 10–12. It is a separate campus from the Clinton school district's ninth-grade campus, Sumner Hill, which enrolls an additional 350 students. Demographic information about CHS and other schools throughout the Clinton Public School District is posted annually on the Mississippi Department of Education Web site.

Academics

AP Courses Offered

Clubs and Organizations
Clinton High School offers a variety of clubs and organizations that cater to the students' diverse needs.

Academic Team
Anchor Club
Arrow Players
Arrow Singers
Art Club
Attache Show Choir
Band
Book Club
Chemistry Club
Chess Club
Color Guard
Cultural Awareness Society
DECA (Distributive Education Clubs of America)
Diamond Girls
FEA (Future Educators Association)
GSA (Gay-Straight Alliance)
HOSA (Health Occupations Students of America)
History Club
International Thespian Society
Jazz Band
Journalism
Model United Nations
Mu Alpha Theta
National Honor Society
SADD (Students Against Destructive Decisions)
Science Olympiad
SkillsUSA
Spanish Club
Speech and Debate Team (Forensics)
Student Council
Winter Guard
Youth in Government

Attaché Show Choir
Clinton's Attaché Show Choir is considered to be one of the top show choirs in the nation.  Clinton Attaché is under the direction of David and Mary Fehr. Since 1992, Attaché has competed in 94 competitions across the United States. In that time they have been named Grand Champion 85 times at 34 different venues in 12 different states. In the same time, Attaché has finished in 2nd place seven (7) times, 3rd place once (1), and 4th place once (1). As of March 12, 2022, Attaché has broken its previous record of 22 consecutive grand championships (2001-2008) while competing against elite groups across the nation. Attaché currently holds the longest winning streak in the history of show choir (2014–Present) at 23 consecutive grand championships. It has on multiple occasions been ranked the No. 1 show choir in America by the Show Choir Ranking System. Attaché is composed of 41 singers and dancers, 15 pit members, and 8 crew members. The pit is directed by Robert Allen, and the crew is directed by Deborah Morgan. Technical Support includes Robert Gatewood and Jesse Emling.  Attaché also has been the host of Show Choir Nationals in Nashville, TN for 20 straight years.

Arrow Singers
Clinton's Arrow Singers is an all-superior rated choral program. The Arrow Singers are under the direction of Carol Joy Sparkman. The Arrow Singers consist of six choirs:
Arrow401 –  SSAA choir a Capella choir
Diversity- SATB a Capella choir
Belles Voix – beginner's SSAA choir
Vivace – advanced SSAA choir
Varsity Men – TTBB choir
Colla Voce – SATB choir

Arrow Singers frequently perform with Distinguished Concerts International New York. In 2016, they performed at Carnegie Hall. In 2018, they performed at Lincoln Center.

Clinton Arrow Bands

Ensembles
Color Guard
Indoor Percussion
Marching Band
Concert Band

Athletics
Clinton Arrows participate in the following sports:

Baseball
Basketball – Boys
Basketball – Girls
Bowling
Cheerleaders
Cross Country
Fastpitch softball
Football
Golf
Powerlifting
Slowpitch softball
Soccer – Boys
Soccer – Girls
Swimming
Tennis
Track
Volleyball

Championships and awards
Clinton High School was designated as a National Blue Ribbon School in 1982–1983.
Clinton High School was one of only 50 in the nation to earn a Siemens Foundation Award for Advanced Placement in 2009, for the high quality of its college prep courses and instructors.

Notable alumni

Lance Bass, actor, musician
Mark Childress, novelist
Barry Hannah, novelist
Meredith Edwards, singer
Ted DiBiase Jr., actor and professional wrestler.
Sasha Goodlett, Women's National Basketball Association player for the Chicago Sky
Cam Akers, National Football League running back for the Los Angeles Rams

References

External links
Clinton High School
Clinton Bands
Clinton Attache
Arrow Athletics

Public high schools in Mississippi
Schools in Hinds County, Mississippi